Miroslav Talijan (born 10 August 1970 in Smederevska Palanka) is a brigadier general of the Serbian Army. He is the current commander of the 72nd Brigade for Special Operations and a former chief of the Military Academy. 

He was the commander of the elite anti-terrorist Battalion "Sokolovi", then the deputy commander of the Cobras, and then focused on education, so he became one of the youngest doctor of sciences in the Serbian Armed Forces. Having fought in the Kosovo War, he is one of the few special forces members who took part in combat operations and managed to get a doctorate on the same topic.

References 

1970 births
People from Smederevska Palanka
Brigadier generals
Serbian generals
Living people
Serbian military personnel of the Kosovo War